New Hampshire law required a candidate to receive votes from a majority of voters (10%). In the August 27, 1810 initial election, only two candidates won a majority, so a second election was held April 1, 1811 for the remaining three seats, after the congressional term began but before the Congress formally convened.  The data from the source used give majorities to all the top five candidates, suggesting that the data are incomplete.

See also 
 United States House of Representatives elections, 1810 and 1811
 List of United States representatives from New Hampshire

References 

1810
New Hampshire
New Hampshire
United States House of Representatives
United States House of Representatives